Z (or z) is the 26th and last letter of the Latin alphabet, as used in the modern English alphabet, the alphabets of other western European languages and others worldwide. Its usual names in English are zed and zee, with an occasional archaic variant izzard.

Name and pronunciation
In most English-speaking countries, including Australia, Canada, India, Ireland, New Zealand and the United Kingdom, the letter's name is zed , reflecting its derivation from the Greek zeta (this dates to Latin, which borrowed Y and Z from Greek), but in American English its name is zee , analogous to the names for B, C, D, etc., and deriving from a late 17th-century English dialectal form.

Another English dialectal form is izzard . This dates from the mid-18th century and probably derives from Occitan  or the French , whose reconstructed Latin form would be *idzēta, perhaps a Vulgar Latin form with a prosthetic vowel. Its variants are still used in Hong Kong English and Cantonese.

In Standard Chinese pinyin, the name of the letter Z is pronounced , as in "zi", although the English zed and zee have become very common. In Esperanto the name of the letter Z is pronounced .

Under the NATO spelling alphabet, the letter is signified with ZULU, like the Zulu people.

History

Semitic
The Semitic symbol was the seventh letter, named zayin, which meant "weapon" or "sword". It represented either the sound  as in English and French, or possibly more like  (as in Italian).

Greek
The Greek form of Z was a close copy of the Phoenician Zayin, and the Greek inscriptional form remained in this shape throughout ancient times. The Greeks called it zeta, a new name made in imitation of eta (η) and theta (θ).

In the common dialect (koine) that succeeded the older dialects, ζ became , as it remains in modern Greek.

Etruscan
The Etruscan letter Z was derived from the Phoenician alphabet, most probably through the Greek alphabet used on the island of Ischia. In Etruscan, this letter may have represented .

Latin
The letter Z was borrowed from the Greek Zeta, most likely to represent the sound /t͡s/. At c. 300 BC, Appius Claudius Caecus, the Roman censor, removed the letter Z from the alphabet, allegedly due to his distaste for the letter, in that it "looked like the tongue of a corpse". A more likely explanation is the sound had disappeared from Latin, making the letter useless for spelling Latin words. It is also thought due to rhotacism, Z became a trilled R sound, /r/. Whatever the case may be, Appius Claudius' distaste for the letter Z is today credited as the reason for its removal. A few centuries later, after the Roman Conquest of Greece, Z was again borrowed to spell words from the prestigious Attic dialect of Greek.

Likewise,  sometimes replaced  in words like  for  "to baptize". In other languages, such as Spanish, further evolution of the sound occurred.

Old English
Old English used S alone for both the unvoiced and the voiced sibilant. The Latin sound imported through French was new and was not written with Z but with G or I. The successive changes can be seen in the doublet forms jealous and zealous. Both of these come from a late Latin , derived from the imported Greek  .

Z at the end of a word was pronounced ts, as in English assets, from Old French  "enough" (Modern French ), from Vulgar Latin  ("to sufficiency").

Last letter of the alphabet
In earlier times, the English alphabets used by children terminated not with Z but with & or related typographic symbols. In her 1859 novel Adam Bede, George Eliot refers to Z being followed by & when her character Jacob Storey says, "He thought it [Z] had only been put to finish off th' alphabet like; though ampusand would ha' done as well, for what he could see."

Some Latin based alphabets have extra letters on the end of the alphabet. The last letter for the Icelandic, Finnish and Swedish alphabets is Ö, while it is Å for Danish and Norwegian. In the German alphabet, the umlauts (Ä/ä, Ö/ö, and Ü/ü) and the letter ß (Eszett or scharfes S) are regarded respectively as modifications of the vowels a/o/u and as a (standardized) variant spelling of ss, not as independent letters, so they come after the unmodified letters in the alphabetical order. The German alphabet ends with z.

Variant and derived forms 
A glyph variant of Z originating in the medieval Gothic minuscules and the Early Modern Blackletter typefaces is the "tailed z" (German , also ). In some Antiqua typefaces, this letter is present as a standalone letter or in ligatures. Ligated with long s (ſ), it is part of the origin of the Eszett (ß) in the German alphabet. The character ezh (Ʒ) resembles a tailed z, which came to be indistinguishable from the yogh (ȝ) in Middle English writing.

There is also a variant with a stroke.

Pronunciation and use

English
In modern English orthography, the letter  usually represents the sound .

It represents  in words like seizure. In all these words,  developed from earlier  by yod-coalescence.

It is the least frequently used letter in written English, with a frequency of about 0.08% in words.
 is more common in the Oxford spelling of British English than in standard British English, as this variant prefers the more etymologically 'correct' -ize endings, which are closer to Greek, to -ise endings, which are closer to French; however, -yse is preferred over -yze in Oxford spelling, as it is closer to the original Greek roots of words like analyse. The most common variety of English it is used in is American English, which prefers both the -ize and -yze endings. One native Germanic English word that contains 'z', freeze (past froze, participle frozen) came to be spelled that way by convention, even though it could have been spelled with 's' (as with choose, chose and chosen).

 is used in writing to represent the act of sleeping (often using multiple z's, like zzzz), as an onomatopoeia for the sound of closed-mouth human snoring.

Other languages
 stands for a voiced alveolar or voiced dental sibilant , in Albanian, Breton, Czech, Dutch, French, Hungarian, Latvian, Lithuanian, Romanian, Serbo-Croatian, Slovak, and the International Phonetic Alphabet. In Basque, it represents the sound .

The letter  on its own represents  in Polish.

The letter  on its own represents .

In Modern Scots  is used in place of the obsolete letter  (yogh) and should be pronounced as a hard 'g'. Often the names are mispronounced to follow the apparent English spelling so Mackenzie is commonly pronounced with a 'z' sound. Menzies, however, still retains the correct pronunciation of 'Mingus'.

In Turkmen,  represents .

Additionally, in the Nihon-shiki and Kunrei-shiki systems,  is used to represent that same phoneme before , where it's pronounced .

Other systems

Uses of Z as a symbol
 In mathematics,  is used to denote the set of integers. Originally,  was just a handwritten version of the bold capital Z used in printing but, over time, it has come to be used more frequently in printed works too.
 It geometry, z is used to denote the third axis in Cartesian coordinates when representing 3-dimensional space.
 In chemistry, the letter Z is used to denote the Atomic number of an element (number of protons), such as Z=3 for Lithium.
 In electrical engineering, Z is used to denote electrical impedance.
 In astronomy, z is a dimensionless quantity representing redshift.
 The Z boson is a particle in nuclear physics.
 Z has been used as a military symbol by Russian forces during the 2022 Russian invasion of Ukraine. Russian civilians have used to express support for the invasion.

Related characters

Descendants and related characters in the Latin alphabet
 Z with diacritics: Ź ź Ẑ ẑ Ž ž Ż ż Ẓ ẓ Ẕ ẕ Ƶ ƶ ᵶ Ᶎ ᶎ Ⱬ ⱬ
(In some typefaces and handwriting styles it is rather a ligature of long s and tailed z (ſʒ).)
 Ȥ ȥ: Latin letter z with a hook, intended for the transcription of Middle High German, for instances of the letter z with a sound value of /s/.
 Ɀ ɀ : Latin letter Z with swash tail
 Ʒ ʒ : Latin letter ezh
 Ꝣ ꝣ : Visigothic Z
 Ᶎ ᶎ : Z with hook, used for writing Mandarin Chinese using the early draft version of pinyin romanization during the mid-1950s
 IPA-specific symbols related to Z:    
  is used in the Uralic Phonetic Alphabet
 Modifier letters ᶻ ᶼ ᶽ are used in phonetic transcription

Ancestors and siblings in other alphabets
 𐤆 : Semitic letter Zayin, from which the following letters derive
 Ζ ζ : Greek letter Zeta, from which the following letters derive
  : Coptic letter Zēta
 𐌆 : Old Italic Z, which is the ancestor of modern Latin Z
  : Gothic letter ezec
 З з : Cyrillic letter Ze

Computing codes

 1 

On the QWERTZ keyboard used in Central Europe the Z replaces the Y of the standard US/UK QWERTY keyboard as the sixth letter of the first row.

Other representations

See also
 Bourbaki dangerous bend symbol, 
 Z with stroke, Ƶ
 Zed
 Zee
 Z flag
 Z (military symbol)

References

External links
 
 
 

ISO basic Latin letters